Tham Pla–Namtok Pha Suea National Park is a national park in Mae Hong Son Province, Thailand. It is home to caves, waterfalls and steep mountain terrain. It was established as a national park on 23 December 2010.

Geography
The park's area is 394,120 rai ~ . The northern and western sides of the park border Burma's Shan and Kayah states respectively.

Attractions
The park's main attraction is Tham Pla ("fish cave"), a water-filled cave hosting hundreds of soro brook carp. The fish are revered by locals and a nearby Hindu statue is said to protect them.

Flora and fauna
The park features forest types including mixed deciduous, deciduous dipterocarp, pine and evergreen. Tree species include Lagerstroemia floribunda, tabaek, Shorea obtusa, Shorea siamensis, Sindora siamensis, makha, Xylia xylocarpa, teak, Pterocarpus macrocarpus, Terminalia pedicelleta, takian, Sumatran pine and Khasi pine.

Animals in the park include goral, gaur, barking deer and wild boar.

See also
List of national parks of Thailand
List of Protected Areas Regional Offices of Thailand

References

National parks of Thailand
Geography of Mae Hong Son province
Tourist attractions in Mae Hong Son province